Aacharya Haribhadra Suri was a Svetambara mendicant Jain leader, philosopher, doxographer, and author. There are multiple contradictory dates assigned to his birth. According to tradition, he lived c. 459–529 CE. However, in 1919, a Jain monk named Jinvijay pointed out that given his familiarity with Dharmakirti, a more likely choice would be sometime after 650. In his writings, Haribhadra identifies himself as a student of Jinabhadra and Jinadatta of the Vidyadhara Kula. There are several, somewhat contradictory, accounts of his life. He wrote several books on Yoga, such as the Yogadṛṣṭisamuccaya and on comparative religion, outlining and analyzing the theories of Hindus, Buddhists and Jains.

Life story

The earliest story of his life say that Haribhadra was born in Dharmapuri and that he was an educated Brahmin who decided that he would become a pupil of anyone who could state a sentence which Haribhadra could not understand. After hearing a Jain nun named Yākinī Mahattarā recite a verse that he could not understand, he was sent to her teacher Jinabhaṭa, who promised Haribhadra that he would instruct him if Haribhadra accepted initiation into Jainism. Haribhadra agreed, and took the name Yākinīputra (Spiritual Son of Yākinī).

The second account, which bears similarities to the story of Akalanka Digambara, also shows the state of relations between Buddhist and Jain mendicants at the time. In this story, Haribhadra was teaching two of his nephews. These nephews went to secretly study logic at a Buddhist temple, and fled after being discovered there. One of them was killed by the Buddhists, and the other died of grief later. Haribhadra engaged the monks of this monastery in a philosophical debate, and emerged victorious. He then ordered the losing monks to jump into a vat of hot oil. When Haribhadra's own teacher heard of this, he ordered Haribhadra to undertake severe penances for his unseemly display of anger and attachment. Haribhadra did so, and took the title "Virahānka", which means "having separation (or viraha, from his nephews) as a distinguishing characteristic".

Tradition ascribes some 1440 different works to him. A more creditable number is in the vicinity of 100, some of which are among the most highly regarded works in Jainism. Scholar H.R. Kapadia attributes eighty-seven works to Haribhadra, Jinavijaya attributes twenty-six and Sukh lal Sanghvi attributes forty-seven. Some have even suggested that, based on the language and subject material of the books ascribed to Haribhadra, there were two Haribhadras, the first of which, Haribhadra Virahānka, may have lived around the sixth century, and the second, Haribhadra Yākinīputra, was a monk who lived in a temple around the eighth century. Scholars of the Svetambara community itself tend to hold with the belief that there was only one Haribhadra. Among his important teachings were tolerance for other traditions, and that ultimate reality can be grasped from multiple different perspectives.

Philosophy and influence
With his writings, he established that Sanskrit, rather than Prakrit, would be the language of Jain study. He used his only familiarity with the techniques of brahminical study and wrote in the same style. He is also noted for the great respect he displays toward other religious traditions. He even did what few other Jain scholars have done, and wrote a commentary on the Nyāyapraveśa, a text by Śaṅkarasvāmin on the form of Indian logic formulated by the Buddhist scholar Dignāga. He does however ultimately support Jain thought, arguing that the other beliefs tend to display only a one-sided view of the greater reality. He tried to combine the good points of various religious philosophies that existed in his times for spiritual liberation in his work Yogadrstiamuccaya.

Haribhadra promoted a form of religious pluralism, perennialism and a respect for different religious traditions. He writes that though they have different names, the teachings of those who have achieved liberation (moksha, nirvana, kevala) are grounded on a common truth. He wrote: "Perhaps the teaching is one, but there are various people who hear it.
On account of the inconceivable merit it bestows, it shines forth in various ways."

Works
Among his other works are:

 Anekāntajayapatākā [The Victory Banner of Anekantavada (Relativism)] - which puts forward arguments about Anekantavada
 Anekāntavādapraveśa, discusses Jain Philosophy
 Anekāntasiddhi, It establishes the concept of non-absolutism (anekānta).
 Ātmasiddhi (Realization of Self), a work of Soul
 Upadeśapada, collection of stories which depicts how difficult it is to secure a human birth
 Daṃsaṇasuddhi, text deals with Samyagdarśana (right faith) and its purity
 Darisaṇasattari, another work on Samyagdarśana
 Dhammasaṅgahaṇi, work on Dharma
 Lokatattvanirṇaya, a work of comparative religion where he talks about Hindu Gods
 Saṃsāradāvānalastuti,a work praising Thirtankaras 
 Samarāiccakahā, a collection of stories 
 Sambohapayaraṇa, a work on philosophy

 Ashtakaprakarana (The Eightfold Explanation)
 Dharmabindu - which outlines the duties of the laity, outlines rules for mendicants, and describes the bliss of moksha
 Dhūrtākhyāna (The Rogue's Stories).
 Pañcāśaka - a Prakrit work on rituals and spiritual matters
 Ṣaḍdarśanasamuccaya (Compendium of Six Philosophies) - which compares Jainism with other schools of Indian philosophy
 Samarāiccakahā (The Story of Samarāicca) - a narrative which outlines the effects of karma in a story about the enmity of its characters which endures over several reincarnations
 Sāstravārtāsamuccaya (The Array of Explanatory Teachings)
 Yogabindu (The Seeds of Yoga) - a work on yoga
 Yogadṛṣṭisamuccaya (An Array of Views on Yoga) - another work on yoga
 Yogaśataka - a third work on yoga. In these three volumes, he compares the yoga of Jainism with the other varieties of yoga prevalent in India at the time.
 Sanmatti Prakaran

Notes

 References 

Great Thinkers of the Eastern World (1995), I.P.McGreal (ed.), Harper Collins, New York.
Wiley, Kristi L. Historical Dictionary of Jainism''. Lanham, MD:The Scarecrow Press, Ltd. 2004. .

Jain acharyas
Indian Jain writers
Year of birth uncertain
Indian Jain monks
7th-century Indian Jains
7th-century Jain monks
7th-century Indian monks
8th-century deaths
459 births
Śvētāmbara monks